Yacouba Sawadogo is a farmer from Burkina Faso who has been successfully using a traditional farming technique called Zaï to restore soils damaged by desertification and drought. Such techniques are known by the collective terms agroforestry and farmer-managed natural regeneration.

A 2010 documentary feature film The Man Who Stopped the Desert, first screened in the UK, portrays his life.

He is a native speaker of Mossi. In 2018, he was awarded the Right Livelihood Award. In 2020, he was awarded the Champions of the Earth award.

Early life
Sawadogo was sent to a religious school where the students often didn't have enough to eat. Being the smallest and youngest, he was the one who had to go without.

Background

The northern portions of Burkina Faso fall in the Sahel Belt, a semi-arid region between the Sahara Desert to the north and tropical savannahs further south. The region periodically suffers from drought. The most recent major drought occurred from 1972 to 1984, resulting in a famine which killed hundreds of thousands of people.

One effect of the drought was widespread desertification. Combined with other factors such as overgrazing, poor land management, and overpopulation, the drought led to a substantial increase in barren land, particularly on slopes, due to the comparative difficulty of cultivating sloping land. Uncultivated, the soil experienced increased erosion and compaction. Such practices also led to an annual one metre reduction in the water table in the 1980s.

Soil rehabilitation
Together with Mathieu Ouédraogo, another local farm innovator, Yacouba Sawadogo began experimenting with techniques for rehabilitating damaged soil in the 1970s. He relies on simple approaches traditional to the region: cordons pierreux and zaï holes. Both Sawadogo and Ouédraogo have engaged in extension and outreach efforts to spread their techniques throughout the region.

Cordons pierreux
Cordons pierreux are thin lines of fist-sized stones laid across fields. Their purpose is to form a catchment. When rain falls, it pushes silt across the surface of the field, which then fetches up against the cordon. Slowing down the flow of water gives it more time to soak into the earth. The accumulated silt also provides a comparatively fertile spot for seeds of local plants to sprout. The plants slow the water even further in turn, and their roots break up the compacted soil, thereby making it easier for more water to soak in.

Zaï holes

Zaï holes also catch water, but take a slightly different approach. They are holes dug in the soil. Traditionally they were used in a limited way to restore barren land. Yacouba Sawadogo introduced the innovation of filling them with manure and other biodegradable waste, in order to provide a source of nutrients for plant life. The manure attracts termites, whose tunnels help break up the soil further. He also increased the size of the holes slightly over the traditional models. Zaï holes have been used to help cultivate trees, sorghum, and millet.

Outreach
To promote these methods, particularly zaï holes, Yacouba Sawadogo holds bi-yearly "Market Days" at his farm in the village of Gourga. Attendees from over a hundred regional villages come to share seed samples, swap tips, and learn from one another.

The process was supported by the Dutch scientist Chris Reij (World Resources Institute) and OXFAM UK.

Conflict with Burkinabé government
The area is clearly visible on satellite images east of the hospital and is called Bangr-Raaga in Mossi, which means Forest of Wisdom. Subsequently, this area was annexed by the nearby city of Ouahigouya, under the auspices of a government program to increase city revenues. Under the provisions of the program, Yacouba Sawadogo and his immediate family members are each entitled to one tenth of 1 acre (400m) out of the plot, and do not receive any other compensation.

In 2008, Sawadogo was attempting to raise US$20,000 to purchase the land.

In 2009, Sawadogo was attempting to raise €100,000 because land was now valued at €100,000 from his increased work to fertilizing the lands.

In 2012, settlers reached the edge of the wood.

Since 2019, settlers are erecting the first buildings the forest. The authorities report about an ongoing administrative procedure to protect the land as municipal heritage.

On June 18, 2021, a protective fence for the whole forest was inaugurated, in the presence of the general secretary of the Burkinabé ministry of environment.

See also
 2010 Sahel famine
 Permaculture

References

Burkinabé farmers
Living people
People involved with desert greening
Permaculturalists
Year of birth missing (living people)
21st-century Burkinabé people